Troy Richard Tanner (born October 31, 1963 in Hacienda Heights, California) is a former All-American volleyball player. He was a member of the United States men's national volleyball team that won the gold medal at the 1988 Summer Olympics in Seoul, South Korea.

Tanner attended Los Altos High School. He comes from an athletic family. His father, Rolf Tanner, was a sports enthusiast and encouraged his sons to compete at a high level in their respective sports. Troy has four older brothers, Mark, Kirk, Greg & Brett. Troy's nephew, Russell Mark Tanner, broke the long-standing record as the youngest AAA rated beach volleyball player in 1994.

After his Olympic appearance Tanner played in the professional indoor leagues in Rome, Italy, Zagreb, Croatia and Osaka, Japan. From 1992 to 1999 he competed on the AVP (Pro Beach Volleyball). He was nicknamed ''T2".  Tanner served an assistant volleyball coach for the Brigham Young University men's volleyball team under head coach Carl McGown and more recently coached Misty May-Treanor and Kerri Walsh during their gold medal run in the 2008 Olympics.

Tanner is also the owner/director of Tstreet Volleyball Club, which trains in Irvine, California. Troy is married to Desiree Tanner and has three children, sons Carson and Riley, and daughter Bailey. Troy's hobbies include surfing, playing guitar and ping pong.

References

External links
 Profile at volleyball.org
 

1963 births
Living people
American men's volleyball players
American men's beach volleyball players
American volleyball coaches
Volleyball players at the 1988 Summer Olympics
Olympic gold medalists for the United States in volleyball
Medalists at the 1988 Summer Olympics
BYU Cougars men's volleyball coaches
Pepperdine Waves men's volleyball players
Sportspeople from California
People from Hacienda Heights, California
Goodwill Games medalists in volleyball
Competitors at the 1986 Goodwill Games